Sphenophorus cicatristriatus, known generally as the Rocky Mountain billbug or Denver billbug, is a species of true weevil in the beetle family Curculionidae. It is found in North America.

References

Further reading

External links

 

Dryophthorinae
Articles created by Qbugbot
Beetles described in 1838